Alexander McKay (1841–1917) was an educator in Nova Scotia who was instrumental in supporting the Nova Scotia College of Art and Design, the Local Council of Women of Halifax and education in Nova Scotia.

He is not to be confused with Alexander Howard MacKay (1848–1929), also a Nova Scotia educator.

References 

1841 births
1917 deaths
Canadian educators